GW0742 (also known as GW610742) is a PPARδ/β agonist that is investigated for drug use by GlaxoSmithKline.

Pharmacology

Pharmacodynamics
It is mixed PPAR-B agonist antagonist depending on its dosage. It has weak activity on multiple nuclear receptors as well. It is antagonistic at androgen receptors and VDR. In silico modelling suggest that it has effects on thyroid hormone receptors.

Chemistry

Derivatives
Multiple derivatives of GW0742 core structure has been developed. One of the compound, which has thiazole ring replaced with an oxazole ring inhibited VDR-meditated transcription with IC50 of 660 nM. Other novel analogues which are more potent than GWO742 with reduced toxicity has been developed as well.

Research 
GW0742 has been shown to ameliorate experimentally induced pancreatitis in mice. It also prevents hypertension in diet induced obese mice. and is investigated as potential antidiabetic drug as well. It is anti-inflammatory agent as well.

See also 
 GW501516
 Elafibranor
 Peroxisome proliferator-activated receptor

References 

PPAR agonists
GSK plc brands
Experimental drugs
Trifluoromethyl compounds
Thiazoles
Fluoroarenes
Thioethers